Kothalanka is a village in Mummidivaram Mandal in Dr. B.R. Ambedkar Konaseema district of Andhra Pradesh, India.

References

Villages in Mummidivaram mandal